Leptotrophon is a genus of sea snails, marine gastropod mollusks in the subfamily Trophoninae of the family Muricidae, the murex snails or rock snails.

Species
Species within the genus Leptotrophon include:
 Leptotrophon acerapex (Houart, 1986)
 Leptotrophon alis Houart, 2001
 Leptotrophon atlanticus Pimenta, do Couto & Santos Costa, 2008
 Leptotrophon bernadettae Houart, 1995
 Leptotrophon biocalae Houart, 1995
 Leptotrophon caledonicus Houart, 1995
 Leptotrophon caroae Houart, 1995
 Leptotrophon charcoti Houart, 1995
 Leptotrophon chlidanos Houart, 2001
 Leptotrophon coralensis Houart, 1995
 Leptotrophon coriolis Houart, 1995
 Leptotrophon fusiformis Houart, 2017
 Leptotrophon inaequalis Houart, 1995
 Leptotrophon kastoroae Houart, 1997
 Leptotrophon levii Houart, 1995
 Leptotrophon lineorugosus Houart, 1995
 Leptotrophon marshalli Houart, 1995
 Leptotrophon metivieri Houart, 1995
 Leptotrophon minirotundus (Houart, 1986)
 Leptotrophon minispinosus Houart, 1995
 Leptotrophon musorstomae Houart, 1995
 Leptotrophon perclarus Houart, 2001
 Leptotrophon protocarinatus Houart, 1995
 Leptotrophon richeri Houart, 1995
 Leptotrophon rigidus Houart, 1995
 Leptotrophon segmentatus (Verco, 1909)
 Leptotrophon spinacutus (Houart, 1986)
 Leptotrophon surprisensis Houart, 1995
 Leptotrophon turritellatus Houart, 1995
 Leptotrophon virginiae Houart, 1995
 Leptotrophon wareni Houart & Héros, 2012

References

 
Muricidae